Admiral Sir George Campbell  (14 August 1759 – 23 January 1821) was a Royal Navy officer who went on to be Commander-in-Chief, Portsmouth.

Naval career
Campbell joined the Royal Navy in 1772. In 1802 he went to Jamaica where he commanded the squadron. He was appointed Commander-in-Chief, The Downs in 1808 and Commander-in-Chief, Portsmouth in 1818 and committed suicide in 1821 while still in that role. Campbell was a Groom of the Bedchamber from 1816 until his death.

In the summer of 1809 he served on the panel of judges at the Court-martial of James, Lord Gambier which assessed whether Admiral Lord Gambier had failed to support Captain Lord Cochrane at the Battle of Basque Roads in April 1809. Gambier was controversially cleared of all charges.

Family
He married Eustacia Campbell-Hooke.

References

|-

|-

1759 births
1821 deaths
Knights Grand Cross of the Order of the Bath
Royal Navy admirals
Suicides by firearm in England
Members of the Parliament of the United Kingdom for Carmarthenshire constituencies
UK MPs 1806–1807
UK MPs 1807–1812
UK MPs 1812–1818
British military personnel who committed suicide
British politicians who committed suicide